HC Dmitrov is an ice hockey team based in Dmitrov, Moscow Oblast, Russia.
The team first played during the 2012–13 season of MHL-B.

References

External links
Official website

Ice hockey teams in Russia
Ice hockey in Moscow Oblast